Jimmy Dobson (23 November 1888 – 14 March 1962) was a Scotland international rugby union player. He played at the Wing position.

Rugby Union career

Amateur career

Dobson played for Glasgow Academicals.

Provincial career

He was capped by Glasgow District in 1906.

International career

Dobson was capped by Scotland for just one match.

References

1888 births
1962 deaths
Glasgow Academicals rugby union players
Glasgow District (rugby union) players
Rugby union players from Glasgow
Scotland international rugby union players
Scottish rugby union players
Rugby union wings